Cyrille Sauvage (born 16 January 1973 in Cannes) is a French racing driver. He has competed in such series as International Formula 3000 and Porsche Supercup. He won both the Championnat de France Formule Renault and the Eurocup Formula Renault in 1995.

Racing record

Complete International Formula 3000 results
(key) (Races in bold indicate pole position; races in italics indicate fastest lap.)

External links
 Career statistics from Driver Database

1973 births
Living people
French racing drivers
Sportspeople from Cannes
Formula Renault Eurocup drivers
French Formula Renault 2.0 drivers
French Formula Three Championship drivers
International Formula 3000 drivers
FIA GT Championship drivers
Porsche Supercup drivers
24 Hours of Spa drivers

Walter Lechner Racing drivers
Piquet GP drivers
Draco Racing drivers